Niyaz is the debut album of the Iranian music group Niyaz, an acoustic electronic project.  The word "Niyaz" means "yearning" in Persian.

Niyaz reached #12 in the Billboard Top World Albums chart.

The track Dilruba was remixed by Junkie XL.

Track listing 
 "Ghazal"
 "Nahan 'The Hidden'"
 "Allahi Allah"
 "The Hunt"
 "Dunya"
 "In The Shadow Of Life"
 "Arezou"
 "Golzar"
 "Dilruba"
 "Minara"
 "Amritsar to Amman" (Digipack bonus track)

Lyrical content 

"Nahan" is based on parts of خوش باش که هر که راز داند (Xoš bâš ke har ke râz dânad) from Diwan-e Shams-e Tabrizi by Jalal ad-Din Muhammad Rumi.

"Allahi Allah" is based on a traditional Urdu religious song.

"The Hunt" is based on the poem بیا بریم دشت (Biyâ berim dašt) by the 14th century Persian poet Obeyd-e Zakani.

References 

2005 debut albums
Niyaz albums
Six Degrees Records albums